Harmony Link is a planned submarine power cable between Lithuania and Poland. The purpose of the cable is to finish the transition of the Baltic states from IPS/UPS to the synchronous grid of Continental Europe.

History
On 21 December 2018 Lithuanian electricity grid operator Litgrid and Polish electricity grid operator PSE signed agreement in order to start planning the cable. Project given official name Harmony Link.

Construction works expected to start in 2023 and finish in 2025.

About the project
Harmony Link will connect the Zarnowiec substation in the Pomeranian region of Poland with the Darbenai substation in the Kretinga region of Lithuania. The key component of the interconnector is a 700 MW High Voltage Direct Current (HVDC) cable. The power link will be about 330 km long, of which about 290 km will be the offshore part.

Construction of the interconnector is expected to be completed in 2025.

Financing
The total investment planned for the Harmony Link project is around €680 million, of which €493 million will come from the Connecting Europe Facility.

See also
 Energy in Lithuania
 Electricity sector in Sweden
 Baltic Cable, cable between Germany and Sweden
 Konti-Skan, cable between Denmark and Sweden
 Estlink, cable between Estonia and Finland
 Fenno-Skan, cable between Finland and Sweden
 LitPol Link, cable between Lithuania and Poland
 NordBalt, subsea cable between Lithuania and Sweden
 SwePol, cable between Poland and Sweden

References

External links
 Litgrid

Electrical interconnectors to and from the Baltic grid
Submarine power cables
HVDC transmission lines
Electric power infrastructure in Poland
Electric power transmission systems in Lithuania
Connections across the Baltic Sea
Lithuania–Poland relations